Ashina She'er (阿史那社爾) was a Turkic prince and general in Tang military. He also briefly claimed the Western Turkic Khaganate in 628-634 centered around Beshbaliq.

Early life 
He was born in 609 as second the son of Chuluo Qaghan. He was granted title To shad and appanage of Tiele and Xueyantuo tribes in northern part of Gobi Desert when he was already 11. However he was deposed by local rebellious tribes when his uncle Illig Qaghan went on campaign against Tang. As a result, he fled to Western Turks and took over Beshbaliq and Karakhoja, claiming the title of Dubu Khagan. As he viewed Xueyantuo as the source of Illig's downfall, he vowed vengeance against Xueyantuo, and he attacked Zhenzhu Khan in or around 634 with 50.000 strong army, with indecisive results. However, at that time a new Western Tujue khan, Ishbara Tolis, had just taken the throne, and a large portion of Ashina She'er's people were not willing to continue fighting, Ishbara, allowing Xueyantuo to counterattack and defeat Ashina She'er. Therefore, he abandoned his quest for being khagan and fled to Gaochang.

In Tang army 
He submitted to Tang with his followers in 635 and immediately appointed as a General of the Left Guard. He was married to Princess Hengyang (衡陽公主), a sister of Taizong in 636. He participated in conquest of Turfan as a commander in 640. He later joined Goguryeo-Tang War (wounded in action) and campaign against Xueyantuo as well.

He personally led campaign against Kucha in 648 with 100.000 strong Tiele cavalries. His deputy commanders were Qibi Heli (a Tiele chieftain who had also become a Tang general) and Guo Xiaoke. Campaign was a success but his deputy Guo was murdered by rebellious Kuchans. In retribution for the death of Guo Xiaoke, Ashina She'er ordered the execution of eleven thousand Kuchean inhabitants by decapitation. It was recorded that "he destroyed five great towns and with them many myriads of men and women... the lands of the west were seized with terror." After Kucha's defeat, Ashina dispatched a small force of light cavalry led by the lieutenant Xue Wanbei to Khotan, ruled by the king Yuchi Fushexin. The threat of an invasion persuaded the king to visit the Tang court in person. He was created Duke Bi (毕国公) by Taizong for his successes.

Later life 
He requested to buried alongside Taizong upon his death or to be appointed as the guard of his tomb. However, he was dissuaded from that by new Emperor Gaozong, who created him General of the Right Guard. He died in 655 and buried alongside Taizong. He was posthumously renamed Yuan (元).

Family 
He was married to Princess Hengyang (衡陽公主) and had a son named Ashina Daozhen (阿史那道真) who was a general and participated as a deputy of Xue Rengui in the war against Tibetan Empire in 670.

In popular media 
He was portrayed by Qumuqu Huoqiufeng in 2017 Chinese costume drama "The World of Chang'an" (天下长安).

References

Sources 
 Old Book of Tang, vol. 59
 New Book of Tang, vol. 35

Ashina house of the Turkic Empire
655 deaths
609 births
7th-century rulers in Asia
7th-century Turkic people